The Slovak Super Cup (Slovenský Superpohár in Slovak), in the past named as Matičný pohár or Pribinov pohár, was a football match between the champion of the Corgoň Liga and winner of the Slovak Cup. The cup was played annually besides years when a club clinched the double.

In 1993 there was played unofficial first match between Slovan Bratislava and the Slovakia national football team consisted with the Slovak First League players. The Slovak Supercup was discontinued in 2016 and replaced by the Czechoslovak Supercup from 2017 onward.

Winners

Performance by club

External links
 Slovakia - List of Super Cup Finals

 
Football cup competitions in Slovakia
Slovakia